The 190th Massachusetts General Court, consisting of the Massachusetts Senate and the Massachusetts House of Representatives, met in 2017 and 2018 during the governorship of Charlie Baker. Harriette L. Chandler served as president of the Senate and Robert DeLeo served as speaker of the House.

Senators

Representatives

See also
 115th United States Congress
 List of Massachusetts General Courts

References

External links

  (2017, 2018)
  (includes some video)
 Ballotpedia. 2018 Massachusetts legislative session

Political history of Massachusetts
Massachusetts legislative sessions
massachusetts
2017 in Massachusetts
massachusetts
2018 in Massachusetts